Nellie Miller (born February 14, 1988) is a World Barrel Racing Champion. She is a professional rodeo barrel racer who won the championship at the National Finals Rodeo (NFR) in Las Vegas, Nevada, in December 2017. Her horse, Sister, also won the AQHA/WPRA Barrel Racing Horse of the Year that season

Life
Nellie Miller was born Nellie Williams on February 14, 1988, in Cottonwood, California. Williams' father Sam trains all of her horses. He first trained a horse named Blue Duck. Blue Duck was initially Sam's roping horse but became Williams' barrel riding horse. Sister, Williams' current horse was also trained by the family. She was named Sister due to being Blue Duck's half-sister. Williams was 12 years old when she started barrel racing. Sam taught her all about horse riding. She competed on the National Intercollegiate Rodeo Association.

Career
Miller turned professional in barrel racing by joining the Women's Professional Rodeo Association (WPRA) in 2008. She competed in barrel riding sanctioned by the Professional Rodeo Cowboys Association (PRCA) each year and qualified for the NFR four times. She won the World Barrel Racing Championship at the NFR in 2017. She also won many rodeos during the regular seasons of the years 2010 through 2019, including major rodeos such as Cheyenne Frontier Days in Cheyenne, Wyoming, and RodeoHouston in Houston, Texas.

Season 2019
Miller came into the NFR this year in the number one position, which was her first time to do so. Some highlights from this season: Miller came in second place in the standings for the California Circuit. She was co-champion at Cheyenne Frontier Days. She was the co-champion at the Stonyford Rodeo in California. She won the Santa Maria Elks Rodeo in California. She won the Stampede Days Rodeo in Bakersfield, California. She won the Red Bluff Round-Up in California, which is her hometown rodeo. She won the Helzapoppin in Buckeye, Arizona. She won RodeoHouston for the second time in a row.

Summary
Miller qualified for the NFR four times, in 2010, 2017, 2018, and 2019. She finished 5th in the 2019 World Standings with $235,898.96 in total yearly earnings. Her career earnings as of 2019 are $876,021.

Horse
Miller's horse, registered name Rafter W Minnie Reba, nicknamed Sister, was named the AQHA/WPRA Barrel Racing Horse of the Year in 2017. She was also named the Horse with the Most Heart that same year. Sister is a blue roan Quarter Horse mare. Sister is by KS Cash N Fame out of Espuela Roan, a daughter of Blue Light Ike.

Personal
Williams met James Miller in Las Vegas, Nevada. They got married in Las Vegas. They have two daughters. Her favorite rodeo is California Rodeo Salinas.

References

Bibliography

External links 
 Women's Professional Rodeo Association
 Professional Rodeo Cowboys Association
 National Finals Rodeo
 World Champion Barrel Racer Nellie Miller for COWGIRL Magazine | COWGIRL
 Nellie Miller Barrel Racing Round 1 | NFR 2017 Interviews
 Nellie Miller at CFD 2019

1988 births
Living people
People from Cottonwood, California
Sportspeople from California
American barrel racers
American female equestrians
21st-century American women